In physics, there are four observed fundamental interactions (also known as fundamental forces) that form the basis of all known interactions in nature: gravitational, electromagnetic, strong nuclear, and weak nuclear forces. Some speculative theories have proposed a fifth force to explain various anomalous observations that do not fit existing theories. The characteristics of this fifth force depend on the hypothesis being advanced. Many postulate a force roughly the strength of gravity (i.e., it is much weaker than electromagnetism or the nuclear forces) with a range of anywhere from less than a millimeter to cosmological scales. Another proposal is a new weak force mediated by W′ and Z′ bosons.

The search for a fifth force has increased in recent decades due to two discoveries in cosmology which are not explained by current theories. It has been discovered that most of the mass of the universe is accounted for by an unknown form of matter called dark matter. Most physicists believe that dark matter consists of new, undiscovered subatomic particles, but some believe that it could be related to an unknown fundamental force. Second, it has also recently been discovered that the expansion of the universe is accelerating, which has been attributed to a form of energy called dark energy. Some physicists speculate that a form of dark energy called quintessence could be a fifth force.

Experimental approaches
A new fundamental force might be difficult to test. Gravity, for example, is such a weak force that the gravitational interaction between two objects is only significant when at least one of them has a great mass. Therefore, it takes very sensitive equipment to measure gravitational interactions between objects that are small compared to the Earth. A new (or "fifth") fundamental force might similarly be weak and therefore difficult to detect. Nonetheless, in the late 1980s a fifth force, operating on municipal scales (i.e. with a range of about 100 meters), was reported by researchers (Fischbach et al.) who were reanalyzing results of Loránd Eötvös from earlier in the century. The force was believed to be linked with hypercharge. Over a number of years, other experiments have failed to duplicate this result.

There are at least three kinds of searches that can be undertaken, which depend on the kind of force being considered, and its range.

Equivalence principle
One way to search for a fifth force is with tests of the strong equivalence principle, one of the most powerful tests of general relativity, also known as Einstein's theory of gravity. Alternative theories of gravity, such as Brans–Dicke theory, postulate a fifth possibly one with infinite range. This is because gravitational interactions, in theories other than general relativity, have degrees of freedom other than the "metric", which dictates the curvature of space, and different kinds of degrees of freedom produce different effects. For example, a scalar field cannot produce the bending of light rays.

The fifth force would manifest itself in an effect on solar system orbits, called the Nordtvedt effect. This is tested with Lunar Laser Ranging experiment and very-long-baseline interferometry.

Extra dimensions
Another kind of fifth force, which arises in Kaluza–Klein theory, where the universe has extra dimensions, or in supergravity or string theory is the Yukawa force, which is transmitted by a light scalar field (i.e. a scalar field with a long Compton wavelength, which determines the range). This has prompted a lot of recent interest, as a theory of supersymmetric large extra dimensions with size slightly less than a has prompted an experimental effort to test gravity on these very small scales. This requires extremely sensitive experiments which search for a deviation from the inverse-square law of gravity over a range of distances. Essentially, they are looking for signs that the Yukawa interaction is kicking in at a certain length.

Australian researchers, attempting to measure the gravitational constant deep in a mine shaft, found a discrepancy between the predicted and measured value, with the measured value being two percent too small. They concluded that the results may be explained by a repulsive fifth force with a range from a few centimetres to a kilometre. Similar experiments have been carried out on board a submarine, USS Dolphin (AGSS-555), while deeply submerged. A further experiment measuring the gravitational constant in a deep borehole in the Greenland ice sheet found discrepancies of a few percent, but it was not possible to eliminate a geological source for the observed signal.

Earth's mantle
Another experiment uses the Earth's mantle as a giant particle detector, focusing on geoelectrons.

Cepheid variables
Jain et al. (2012) examined existing data on the rate of pulsation of over a thousand cepheid variable stars in 25 galaxies. Theory suggests that the rate of cepheid pulsation in galaxies screened from a hypothetical fifth force by neighbouring clusters, would follow a different pattern from cepheids that are not screened. They were unable to find any variation from Einstein's theory of gravity.

Other approaches
A comprehensive review by Ephraim Fischbach and Carrick Talmadge suggested there is no compelling evidence for the fifth force, though scientists still search for it. The Fischbach-Talmadge article was written in 1992, and since then, other evidence has come to light that may indicate a fifth force.

The above experiments search for a fifth force that is, like gravity, independent of the composition of an object, so all objects experience the force in proportion to their masses. Forces that depend on the composition of an object can be very sensitively tested by torsion balance experiments of a type invented by Loránd Eötvös. Such forces may depend, for example, on the ratio of protons to neutrons in an atomic nucleus, nuclear spin, or the relative amount of different kinds of binding energy in a nucleus (see the semi-empirical mass formula). Searches have been done from very short ranges, to municipal scales, to the scale of the Earth, the Sun, and dark matter at the center of the galaxy.

Claims of new particles

In 2015, Attila Krasznahorkay at ATOMKI, the Hungarian Academy of Sciences's Institute for Nuclear Research in Debrecen, Hungary, and his colleagues posited the existence of a new, light boson only 34 times heavier than the electron (17 MeV). In an effort to find a dark photon, the Hungarian team fired protons at thin targets of lithium-7, which created unstable beryllium-8 nuclei that then decayed and ejected pairs of electrons and positrons.

The ATOMKI group had claimed to find various other new particles earlier in 2016 but abandoned these claims later, without an explanation for the spurious signals. The group has also been accused of cherry-picking results that support new particles while discarding null results.

In November 2019, Krasznahorkay announced that he and his team at ATOMKI had successfully observed the same anomalies in the decay of stable helium atoms as had been observed in beryllium-8, strengthening the case for the X17 particle's existence.

Feng et al. (2016) proposed that a protophobic (i.e. "proton-ignoring") X-boson with a mass of 16.7 MeV with suppressed couplings to protons relative to neutrons and electrons and femtometer range could explain the data. The force may explain the muon  anomaly and provide a dark matter candidate. Several research experiments are underway to attempt to validate or refute these results.

Modified gravity
Also known as non-local gravity. Some physicists believe that Einstein's theory of gravity will have to be modified – not at small scales, but at large distances, or equivalently, at small accelerations. This would change gravitation to a non-local force. They point out that dark matter and dark energy are unexplained by the Standard Model of particle physics and suggest that some modification of gravity is necessary, possibly arising from modified Newtonian dynamics or the holographic principle. This is fundamentally different from conventional ideas of a fifth force, as it grows stronger relative to gravity at longer distances. Most physicists, however, think that dark matter and dark energy are not ad hoc, but are supported by a large number of complementary observations and described by a very simple model.

In April 2021, a Fermilab group reported "strong evidence for the existence of an undiscovered sub-atomic particle or new force" that interacts with muons, when measurements of the muon g-2 deviated from the prediction.

See also

References

Force